The Canterbury Province was a province of New Zealand from 1853 until the abolition of provincial government in 1876. Its capital was Christchurch.

History
Canterbury was founded in December 1850 by the Canterbury Association of influential Englishmen associated with the Church of England. (An attempt was initially made to restrict residence in the province to members of the church but this was abandoned.) The Charlotte Jane and the Randolph—the first two of the First Four Ships—arrived in the area on 16 December 1850, later celebrated as the province's Anniversary Day.

In 1852, the Parliament of the United Kingdom passed the New Zealand Constitution Act 1852, which amongst other things established provincial councils. The Constitution contained specific provisions for the Canterbury Association; the first being that the new General Assembly (New Zealand Parliament) could not amend the legislation establishing the Canterbury Association, the second being that the Canterbury Association could hand its powers to a newly-established provincial government (the Canterbury Province).

Elections were held in 1853 for Superintendent and, later that year, for the 12-member council. These elections predated any elected national assembly. The franchise was extended to men over the age of 21 who owned property in the province. As a result, affairs of the Canterbury Association were wound up in 1855 and outstanding settlement lands handed over to the Canterbury Province. The first meeting place was the former office of the Guardian and Advertiser, Canterbury's second newspaper, on Chester Street near the Avon River. In 1866, the council moved to Guise Brittan's house, which later became part of the Clarendon Hotel. One session in 1858 was held in the town hall on what is now High Street; the town hall was in the section north of Lichfield Street. On 28 September 1859, the council first met in what became known as the Timber Chamber of the Canterbury Provincial Council Buildings. The Stone Chamber of the Provincial Council Buildings was used from November 1865.

Following the West Coast Gold Rush, the portion of the province west of the Southern Alps was split off as Westland in 1867. Upon the establishment of the University of New Zealand in 1870, its Christchurch campus housed the system's headquarters.

Geography

On the east coast the province was bounded by the Hurunui River in the north and the Waitaki River in the south. The boundary on the west coast was largely undefined before the West Coast became its own province.

In 1868 the West Coast was separated from the Province with the formation of the County of Westland on the West Coast with the boundary line defined as the crest of the Southern Alps. In 1873 the County formed its own Province, the short-lived Westland Province.

In the south the course of the Waitaki River was not known and disputes arose with the Province of Otago over pastoral leases in the inland high country.

In the 1860s South Canterbury made two bids to become separate province but this was rejected by the national government. Instead in 1867 the General Assembly created the Timaru and Gladstone Board of Works which received a proportion of the Canterbury provincial land revenues and was authorised to maintain and build the Timaru harbour and local roads and bridges.

When the province was abolished, the area was distributed across eight counties.

Railways
The Ferrymead Railway was the first railway to be opened (1863) and closed (1868) in New Zealand. It was made obsolete by the opening of a new  line through a tunnel giving Christchurch access to the better port of Lyttelton. The mainlines of the Canterbury Provincial Railways were Irish gauge with some branch lines in Colonial gauge. These lines were all eventually absorbed into the New Zealand Railways Department in 1876.

Superintendents
Charles Simeon was the returning officer for the first election of a Superintendent. The nomination meeting was held at the Christchurch Land Office (the site now occupied by Our City), and there were three polling stations: in Christchurch at the Resident Magistrate's Court, in Lyttelton at the Resident Magistrate's Court, and in Akaroa.

Canterbury had four Superintendents:

Executive Council
The Executive Council is comparable to a cabinet. The following 26 Executive Councils existed:

Anniversary Day
Each New Zealand province celebrates an anniversary day. Canterbury Province's was originally 16 December, the day of the 1850 arrival of the Charlotte Jane and the Randolph. Since 1862, an A&P (Agricultural and Pastoral) show has been held annually. Its Friday Show Day was set for many years on the People's Day and, sometime in the late 1950s, the Christchurch City Council moved the province's Anniversary Day to coincide with the show and encourage greater crowds. The holiday is presently defined as the "second Friday after the first Tuesday in November", ensuring that it will follow the Melbourne Cup Racing Carnival. This adjustment is observed in northern and middle Canterbury; southern Canterbury instead observes its Anniversary Day on Dominion Day (the 4th Monday in September).

Legislation
 Canterbury Ordinances 1853 – 1875 The full text of the legislation enacted by the Canterbury Provincial Council between its inception in 1853 and its demise in 1875.
 Church Property Trust Ordinance 1854
 Christ's College Ordinance 1855
 Municipal Councils Reserves Ordinance 1862
 Municipal Corporation Reserves Ordinance 1868
 Reserve No 424 Ordinance 1873
 Educational Reserves Leasing Ordinance (No 2) 1875
 Reserve No 168 Ordinance 1875
 Reserve No 62 Ordinance 1875

See also
Edward Jollie 
Arthur Dudley Dobson
1853 New Zealand provincial elections

Notes

References 
 .

External links
 Map of the old provincial boundaries
 List at Rulers site with provincial superintendents

History of Canterbury, New Zealand
Provinces of New Zealand
States and territories established in 1853
1876 disestablishments in New Zealand
1853 establishments in New Zealand